Thomas Chalmers Harbaugh (January 13, 1849October 28, 1924) was an American poet and novelist.

Biography
He was born on January 13, 1849, in Middletown, Maryland. When he was two years old, his family moved to Casstown, Ohio, where he was educated in local schools. He thereafter he worked for his father, a house painter. In 1867 began to devote his time to writing, mainly of short stories and serials for dime novels. He was one of the authors of the Nick Carter Detective Stories. He wrote from 300 to 600 thrillers, at the rate of one a week, with pen; later, in the days of the typewriter, he sometimes bettered his speed. He died penniless in the Miami County Poor House, Ohio on October 28, 1924.

Legacy
He is known for the sentimental poem "Trouble in the Amen Corner". Some of its verses have been turned into a song, which has been recorded several times with commercial success.

References

External links
 
 
 
 Thomas Chalmer Harbaugh's poem "Trouble in the Amen Corner" recited by Efrain Gomez

19th-century American novelists
Novelists from Maryland
Novelists from Ohio
People from Frederick County, Maryland
People from Miami County, Ohio
1849 births
1924 deaths
19th-century American poets
American male novelists
American male poets
19th-century American male writers
Dime novelists